State Art Museum of Adjara is a museum in the city of Batumi in  Adjara, Georgia.

Museum collection 
The museum houses paintings of native Georgian as well as foreign artists. Museum collection has works of Niko Pirosmani, David Kakabadze, Lado Gudiashvili, Elene Akhvlediani, Stefan Bakałowicz, A. Zommer, Nikoloz (Koka) Ignatov, A. Zankovski  and drawing made by N. Churgulia, Rusudan Petviashvili, L. Zambakhidze, G. Tsereteli etc. Sculptures  are represented by E. Pantareli's “Nymph and a Little Faun”, Irakli Ochiauri’s “Portrait” and others. Decorative art collection has many works of ceramics, woodcuts, glasswork, engravings, tapestry.

See also
 List of museums in Georgia (country)

References 

Museums in Batumi
Art museums and galleries in Georgia (country)